Saltany (Saltaanı) is a rural locality (a selo) in Chappandinsky Rural Okrug of Nyurbinsky District in the Sakha Republic, Russia, located  from Nyurba, the administrative center of the district, and  from Chappanda, the administrative center of the rural okrug. Its population as of the 2010 Census was 7, down from 15 recorded during the 2002 Census.

References

Notes

Sources
Official website of the Sakha Republic. Registry of the Administrative-Territorial Divisions of the Sakha Republic. Nyurbinsky District. 

Rural localities in Nyurbinsky District